The final of the Women's Hammer Throw event at the 1999 Pan American Games took place on July 24, 1999. America's Dawn Ellerbe won the first ever Pan Am medal in the event since the women's hammer throw made its debut in Winnipeg, Manitoba, Kingdom of Canada

Medalists

Records

Results

See also
1999 World Championships in Athletics – Women's hammer throw
1999 Hammer Throw Year Ranking

References

External links 
hammerthrow.wz
canthrow.com
athletics.ca

Hammer, Women
1999
1999 in women's athletics